is a Japanese singer-songwriter. She had her debut in 1982 as part of the folk duo  with the single Matsu-wa that became a success in Japan. The duo disbanded in 1984, and Okamura started a successful solo career in 1985. By 2006, she had released 15 original albums and 30 singles. She put her solo career on hold and reformed the duo Aming in 2007 for its 25th anniversary.
On April 21, 2019, it was announced that Okamura was diagnosed with acute leukemia.

Discography

Albums

 夢の樹 (1985.10.19)
 私の中の微風 (1986.07.02)
 liberté (1987.07.05)
 SOLEIL (1988.07.01)
 Eau Du Ciel （天の水） (1989.06.24)
 Kiss -à côté de la mer- (1990.06.27)
 Chou-fleur (1991.07.17)
 mistral (1992.02.21)
 満天の星 (1993.06.20)
 SWEET HEARTS (1994.09.14)
 BRAND-NEW (1996.02.19)
 Reborn (2000.08.23)」
 TEAR DROPS (2003.09.25)
 Sanctuary (2005.03.23)
 四つ葉のクローバー (2006.05.24)
 Yūki (2011.09.07)

Compilations

 Andantino (1986.11.29)
 Andantino a tempo (1987.02.04)
 After Tone (1987.11.25)
 After Tone II (1990.12.12)
 Ballade (1992.12.16)
 After Tone III (1994.03.02)
 Histoire (1994.11.23)
 夢をあきらめないで (1995.03.01)
 夢見る頃を過ぎても (1995.05.01)
 岡村孝子ベスト SUPER BEST 2000 (1995.11.15)
 After Tone IV (2001.09.27)
 DO MY BEST (2002.07.24)
 TOY BOX (2005.11.23)
 Best★BEST 岡村孝子 (2006.09.06)
 After Tone V (2006.12.14)

References

External links
 

1962 births
Japanese women singer-songwriters
People from Okazaki, Aichi
Living people
Musicians from Aichi Prefecture
20th-century Japanese women singers
20th-century Japanese singers
21st-century Japanese women singers
21st-century Japanese singers
Sony Music Entertainment Japan artists